Gomphodontosuchinae is a subfamily of Triassic traversodontid cynodonts. It includes the genera Gomphodontosuchus (the type genus), Exaeretodon, Menadon, Protuberum, Ruberodon, Scalenodontoides and Siriusgnathus.

Below is a cladogram showing the phylogenetic relationships of gomphodontosuchines from Kammerer et al. (2008):

References

Traversodontids
Triassic first appearances
Triassic extinctions
Prehistoric animal subfamilies
Therapsid subfamilies